Evaz Beg (also spelled Ivaz) was a 17th-century Safavid official and royal gholam. Of Georgian origin, he served during the reign of Abbas II (1632–1666), and was the brother of one of the most prominent court eunuchs at the time, Mehtar Davud, as well as of the imperial treasurer and eunuch Mohammad Beg. In 1640, Evaz Beg was appointed governor (vizier) of Lar. A few years later, in 1646–1647, he was briefly made governor (hakem) of the nearby district of Bandar Abbas, which included the islands of Hormuz, Qeshm and Larek. In 1656, he was permitted to resign as governor of Lar and was appointed as divanbegi (chancellor, chief justice), while a few years later, in 1660, he was made governor (vizier) of Bia-pas in Gilan and its provincial capital Rasht. 

Evaz Beg's descendants would hold the government of Lar (and later also that of Bandar Abbas) for many more years to come, until 1725. During this lengthy period, he and his family dominated the politics of the Persian Gulf littoral.

References

Sources
 
  
  
 

17th-century deaths
Safavid ghilman
Iranian people of Georgian descent
Safavid governors of Lar
People from Rasht
Safavid governors in Gilan
People from Hormozgan Province
Safavid governors
17th-century people of Safavid Iran
Safavid slaves